The 2013 IIHF World U20 Championship (commonly known as the 2013 World Junior Ice Hockey Championships) was the 37th edition of the Ice Hockey World Junior Championship (WJC). It was hosted in Ufa, Russia. It began on December 26, 2012, and ended with the gold medal game played on January 5, 2013. The United States defeated defending-champion Sweden 3–1 to win their third title, their first one since 2010. American goalie John Gibson was named MVP of the tournament.

Russia defeated Canada 6–5 in overtime to win the bronze medal, sending the Canadians home without a medal for the first time since 1998.  Latvia was relegated to Division I and Norway was promoted to the 2014 World Junior Ice Hockey Championships.

Venues

Officials
The IIHF selected 12 referees and 10 linesmen to work the 2013 IIHF Ice Hockey U20 World Championship

They were the following:

Referees
  Harry Dumas
  Roman Gofman
  Pavel Hodek
  Georg Jablukov
  Sergei Kulakov
  Jari Levonen
  Didier Massy
  Mikael Nord
  Steve Patafie
  Mikael Sjöqvist
  Pat Smith
  Daniel Sticker

Linesmen
  François Dussureault
  Tommy George
  Tobias Haster
  Raivis Jučers
  Roman Kaderli
  Masi Puolakka
  Stanislav Raming
  Anton Semjonov
  Dmitry Sivov
  Peter Stano

Top division 
Each round will be a round-robin tournament, where the teams play each other once within their group. The Preliminary Round is divided into two groups: Group A and Group B, which includes five teams each. From each group, the top three teams will qualify for the playoffs; the 1st-ranked teams earn a direct trip to the Semifinals, while the 2nd and 3rd-ranked teams qualify for the Quarterfinals. The 4th and 5th-ranked teams have to play in the Relegation Round, where the three best teams qualify for the Top Division tournament the following year, with the last-placed team being relegated to the Division I tournament the following year. In the Semifinals, the directly-qualified Semifinalists face the winners from the Quarterfinals.

Rosters

Preliminary round

Group A

All times local (UTC+6)

Group B

All times local (UTC+6)

Relegation round 
The results from matches between teams from the same group in the preliminary round are carried forward to this round.

All times local (UTC+6)

Final round 
Bracket

Quarterfinals

Semifinals

Fifth place game

Bronze medal game

Final

Statistics

Scoring leaders 

GP = Games played; G = Goals; A = Assists; Pts = Points; +/− = Plus-minus; PIM = Penalties In Minutes
Source: IIHF.com

Goaltending leaders 
(minimum 40% team's total ice time)

TOI = Time on ice (minutes:seconds); SA = Shots against; GA = Goals against; GAA = Goals against average; Sv% = Save percentage; SO = Shutouts
Source: IIHF.com

Tournament awards
References: 1 2
Most Valuable Player
 Goaltender:  John Gibson

All-star team

 Goaltender:  John Gibson
 Defencemen:  Jacob Trouba,  Jake McCabe
 Forwards:  Ryan Nugent-Hopkins,  Filip Forsberg,  Johnny Gaudreau

IIHF best player awards

 Goaltender:  John Gibson
 Defenceman:  Jacob Trouba
 Forward:  Ryan Nugent-Hopkins

Final standings

Medalists

Source:
1
2
3

Division I

Division I A
The Division I A tournament was played in Amiens, France, from 9 to 15 December 2012.

Division I B
The Division I B tournament was played in Donetsk, Ukraine, from 10 to 16 December 2012.

Division II

Division II A
The Division II A tournament was played in Brașov, Romania, from 9 to 15 December 2012.

Division II B
The Division II B tournament was played  in Belgrade, Serbia, from 12 to 18 January 2013.

Division III

The Division III tournament was played  in Sofia, Bulgaria, from 14 to 20 January 2013.

References

External links
Official site

 
World Junior Ice Hockey Championships
World Junior Ice Hockey Championships
2013
World Junior Championships
Sport in Ufa
World Junior Ice Hockey Championships
World Junior Ice Hockey Championships